Ryo Chun-seok (born July 1930) is a military officer and politician of the Democratic People's Republic of Korea. Army General of the Korean People's Army,  President of the Kim Il-sung Military University and a member of the Central Committee of the Party. He was delegate to the 12th convocation of the Supreme People's Assembly.

Biography
In September 1975, he served as Chief of Staff of the 5th Corps as the rank of the Major General of the Korean People's Army, and was elected to the party's Central Committee candidate member in October 1980. In December 1984, he was appointed Lieutenant General of the People's Army to become the 4th Corps commander. In April 1992, he was promoted, and was appointed to the 7th Army Corps Commander in October 1994.

In November 1997, he became Vice-Minister of the Ministry of People's Armed Forces, and in September 1998. In April 2002, he was promoted to Army General. Since February 2008, he has served as president of the Kim Il-sung Military University. In September 2010, he was elected to the Central Committee of the Workers' Party of Korea.

References

North Korean generals
Members of the Supreme People's Assembly
Workers' Party of Korea politicians